The Barrymore Awards for Excellence in Theatre is an annual, nationally recognized award program that is sponsored by Theatre Philadelphia for professional theater productions in the Greater Philadelphia area. Each season culminates in the fall with an awards ceremony and celebration. The Barrymore Awards honoring local artists and theatre companies while increasing public awareness of the richness and diversity of Philadelphia's thriving theatre community.

History
Named in honor of the famed American theatrical family, the Barrymore family, the Barrymore Awards for Excellence in Theatre have served as Philadelphia's professional theatre awards program since the 1994–1995 season.

The awards include an adjudication of twenty-four categories, including five cash awards totaling up to $118,000 for artists and organizations each year. 

In June 2018, Theatre Philadelphia announced the removal of gender identifiers from performance categories.

F. Otto Haas Award 
This annual award acknowledges an emerging theater artist for artistic excellence and promise. List of winners:

 1996 – Michael Hollinger
 1997 – Adam Wernick
 1998 – Robert Christophe
 1999 – Jennifer Childs
 2000 – John Lumia
 2001 – Catherine Slusar
 2002 – Scott Greer
 2003 – Ian Merrill Peakes
 2004 – Jorge Cousineau
 2005 – James Sugg
 2006 – Ben Dibble
 2007 – Matt Saunders
 2008 – Matt Pfeiffer
 2009 – Charlotte Cloe Fox Wind
 2010 – Sarah Sanford
 2011 – James Ijames
 2012 – Steve Pacek
 2013 – Charlotte Ford
 2014 – Liz Filios
 2015 – Akeem Davis
 2016 – Bi Jean Ngo
 2017 – Mary Tuomanen
 2018 – Taysha Canales
 2019 – Jaylene Clark Owens

See also 
 Cushman Award also presented during the Barrymore ceremony since 1995.

References

External links
 

American theater awards
Culture of Philadelphia